By God was the third album released by Christian metal group Disciple in 2001. It was a dual-disc; the second disc was a bonus disc for the buyer to give "to someone who needs it...". The album has been remastered and re-released just like the last album (This Might Sting a Little). The cover was changed to a different style.

Track listing
All tracks by Disciple

 "By God" – 3:48
 "Not Rock Stars" – 3:38
 "God of Elijah" – 3:10
 "Knocked Down" – 3:21
 "Blow the House Down" – 4:03
 "Coal" – 3:26
 "Can't Breathe" – 4:44
 "Salt Lamp" – 3:23
 "You Are Here" – 4:14
 "Thousand Things" – 6:03
 "99" – 2:39
 "Laugh track" – 0:20
 "Whiny Britches" – 3:18
 "You Rock My Socks Off" – 3:08
 "Trouble"  – 0:15
 "Hate Your Guts" – 3:40
 "Whether They Like It Or Not" – 4:22
 "Not Since Breakfast" – 3:13
 "Sick and Tired of Being Sick and Tired" – 4:01
 "But Wait There's More" – 3:36
 "Rich Man" – 4:05
 "Sermon"  – 4:10

Bonus disc track listing
 "By God" – 3:50
 "Not Rock Stars" – 3:39
 "Rich Man" – 4:01
 "Sermon" (Given by Kevin) – 4:10

Personnel 
Based on AllMusic credits:
 Kevin Young – vocals, bass guitar
Brad Noah – guitar
Tim Barrett – drums
 Travis Wyrick – producer
 Dennis Olson – cover design

References

2001 albums
Disciple (band) albums
Albums produced by Travis Wyrick